The 2013 EAFF Women's East Asian Cup was the fourth edition of EAFF Women's East Asian Cup. There were three competition rounds. The final round was won by North Korea. In August 2012, Australia accepted an invitation to take part.

Rounds

Preliminary round 1
All matches were held in Guam (UTC+10).

Matches

Awards

Goals
4 goals

 Paige Surber
 Chan Wing Sze
 Ng Wing Kum

2 goals

 Anjelica Perez
 Fung Kam Mui

1 goals

 Andrea Odell
 Arisa Recella
 Simone Willter
 Cheung Wai Ki
 Lau Mung King
 Po Ching Ying
 Wong Ka Man

1 own goal

 Jeralyn Castillo

Preliminary round 2
All matches were held in Shenzhen, China (UTC+8).

Matches

Goals
4 goals

 Katie Gill

3 goals

 Kyah Simon

2 goals

 Lisa De Vanna
 Ma Xiaoxu
 Wang Chen
 Wang Shanshan
 Zhang Rui
 Lai Li-chin

1 goals

 Tameka Butt
 Stephanie Catley
 Servet Uzunlar
 Pu Wei
 Wang Lisi
 Chan Wing Sze

Awards

Final round

Match officials
Referees

  Li Juan
  Yamagishi Sachiko 
  Jung Ji-young
  Pannipar Kamnueng
  Mai Hoàng Trang

Assistant referees

  Cui Yong Mei 
  Teshirogin Naomi
  Kim Kyung-min
  Parichart Boonanan
  Trương Thị Lệ Trinh

All times listed are local (UTC+9).

Matches

Goals
2 goals

 Ho Un-byol
 Ji So-yun

1 goals

 Wang Lisi
 Li Ying
 Kozue Ando
 Emi Nakajima
 Yūki Ōgimi
 Ri Un-hyang
 Kim Na-rae
 Kim Soo-yun

Awards

Final standings
{| class="wikitable" style="margin: 0 auto;"
|-
!Rank
!Team
|- bgcolor=gold
|align=center|1
|align=left|
|- bgcolor=silver
|align=center|2
|align=left|
|- bgcolor=#cc9966
|align=center|3
|align=left|
|- bgcolor=#9acdff
|align=center|4
|align=left|
|-
|align=center|5
|align=left|
|-
|align=center|6
|align=left|
|-
|align=center|7
|align=left|
|-
|align=center|8
|align=left|
|-
|align=center|9
|align=left|

References

External links
East Asian Football Federation
EAFF Women's East Asian Cup 2013 Final
EAFF Women's East Asian Cup 2013 Preliminary Round 2
EAFF Women's East Asian Cup 2013 Preliminary Round 1

2013 EAFF Women's East Asian Cup
2012 in women's association football
2013 in women's association football
2012 in Asian football
2013 in Asian football
2013
2013 in South Korean football
2012–13 in Australian women's soccer